Muneeb Ali is a Pakistani-American computer scientist and internet entrepreneur. He is a co-founder of Stacks, an open-source smart contract platform for Bitcoin. He is known for the regulatory framework that resulted in the first SEC-qualified offering for a crypto asset and for his doctoral dissertation which formed the basis of the Stacks network. He is a co-author of Protothread and Proof-of-Transfer (PoX) consensus.

Career 
Ali studied Computer Science at LUMS and received his PhD in Computer Science from Princeton University in 2017. Ali co-founded Stacks (formerly Blockstack) with Ryan Shea and went through Y Combinator in 2014.

His work mainly focused on sensor networks, blockchains, and cloud computing.

Ali was a technical advisor to the HBO Silicon Valley show, and appeared in the Amazon Prime Video Rizqi Presents: Blockchain show.

In 2019, he convinced the SEC regulators to allow his company to start a token offering under Reg A+ exemption, becoming the first to do so. In 2020, Ali released a legal framework for non-security status of Stacks.

References 

Living people
American computer scientists
Pakistani emigrants to the United States
American people of Pakistani descent
American businesspeople
Princeton University alumni
Year of birth missing (living people)